More than Human is an American reality television show which ran from 2003 to 2004 for 13 episodes. Airing on the Discovery Channel, the series employed first-person accounts of survival to explore the limits of how people are able to "adapt" to extreme situations.

References

External links 

Episode Guide 

2000s American reality television series
2003 American television series debuts
2004 American television series endings